The V-League 5th Season 2nd Conference is a tournament of the Shakey's V-League. The tournament began on October 19, 2008 at The Arena in the city of San Juan.

Joining are Ateneo de Manila University, Adamson University, De La Salle - College of Saint Benilde, De La Salle University, Far Eastern University, Lyceum of the Philippines University, San Sebastian College - Recoletos and University of Santo Tomas.

Former champion teams University of Santo Tomas and De La Salle University come back after being absent last conference.

After being thrice runner-up and a heartbreaking third-place finish last conference, San Sebastian College - Recoletos finally clinched the championship this season after finishing their former nemesis  University of Santo Tomas in a sweep of the finals series.

Starting line-ups

 (A) - Alumna Player
 (G) - Guest Player
 (C) - Team Captain

Elimination round

PW = points won, PL = points lost, PQ = points quotient
Basis of breaking ties:
 Number of games won
 Higher points quotient

Games list

Bracket

Semifinals

 with season high, 22 blocks

Finals

Conference Awardees

 Best Scorer:    Laurence Ann Latigay (SSC-R)
 Best Attacker:  Rysabelle Devanadera (SSC-R)
 Best Blocker:     Jacqueline Alarca (La Salle)
 Best Setter:     Janet Serafica (Adamson)
 Best Digger:   Lizlee Ann Gata (Adamson)
 Best Server:     Aiza Maizo (UST)
 Best Receiver:   Mary Jane Pepito (SSC-R)
 Conference MVP:  Laurence Anne Latigay (SSC-R)
 Finals MVP: Suzanne Roces (SSC-R)

Shakey's V-League conferences
2008 in volleyball
2008 in Philippine sport